Goverdhan Mehta FNA, FASc, FTWAS, FRS, FRSC (born 26 June 1943) is an Indian researcher and scientist.

Career 
Mehta received his BSc and MSc from the BITS Pilani and PhD from Pune University. His post-doctoral research was at the Michigan State University under Prof. Don Farnum and at the Ohio State University under Prof. Paul G. Gassman.  He joined IIT Kanpur in 1969 and remained there until 1977. From 1977 to 1998, he was Professor of Chemistry at the University of Hyderabad and from 1998 to 2010, he was a Professor at the Indian Institute of Science Bangalore. 
Since 2010 onwards, he is University Distinguished Professor and Dr. Kallam Anji Reddy Chair at Department of Chemistry, University of Hyderabad, India.

Mehta has authored more than 450 research papers. He is a recipient of over 40 Honorary Doctorates from India/abroad and has delivered over 300 invited/plenary lectures at Universities/Institutions across the world.

Academic and Professional positions 
 Research Associate, Michigan State and the Ohio State Universities, US,1967–1969
 Lecturer & Assistant Professor, Indian Institute of Technology, Kanpur, 1969–1977
 Professor, University of Hyderabad, Hyderabad 1977–1998, Founder Dean 1977–1986
 Hon. Professor, Jawaharlal Nehru Centre for Advanced Scientific Research, 1990–2009
 Visiting Professor, University of Notre Dame, Indiana, USA, Jun-1990 
 Srinivasa Ramanujan Research Professor, Indian National Science Academy, 1992–1997
 Vice-Chancellor, University of Hyderabad, 1994–98
 Professor, Department of Organic Chemistry, Indian Institute of Science, 1998–2005
 Director, Indian Institute of Science, Bangalore, 1998–2005
 Tarrant Distinguished Professor, University of Florida, Gainesville, USA, Jun-2002 
 CSIR Bhatnagar Fellow, Indian Institute of Science, Bangalore, 2005–2010
 National Research Professor, 2009–2014
 Lilly-Jubilant Chair Professor, University of Hyderabad, 2010–2018
 Dr. Kallam Anji Reddy Chair, University of Hyderabad, 2018–

Awards 
 Shanti Swarup Bhatnagar Prize for Science and Technology in Chemical Sciences awarded by CSIR (1978) 
 Basudev Bannerji Medal & Prize awarded by Indian Chemical Society (1979)
 Science & Technology Award of Rajasthan Government (1980)
 Professor R.D. Desai Medal & Prize awarded by Indian Chemical Society (1982)
 FICCI Award in Physical Sciences (1983)
 Golden Jubilee Commemoration Medal (Chemical Sciences) awarded by Indian National Science Academy (1989) 
 G.D. Birla Award for Excellence in Science (1992)
 Goyal Prize in Chemical Sciences awarded by Sri Kala Ram Trust (1994)
 Pandit Jawaharlal Nehru National Award for Excellence in Science awarded by MP Government (1994)
 Humboldt Prize (Humboldt-Forschungspreis) awarded by the Alexander von Humboldt Foundation of Germany (1995) (first in India) 
 Acharya P.C. Ray Medal awarded by Indian Chemical Society (1995)
 Dr. Y. Nayudamma Gold Medal awarded by Andhra Pradesh Akademi of Sciences (now Telangana Academy of Sciences) (1998) 
 Padma Shri awarded by Government of India (2001) 
 TWAS Medal awarded by World Academy of Sciences (2001) 
 Millennium Plaque of Honour awarded by Indian Science Congress Association (2002)
 C V Raman Medal awarded by Indian National Science Academy (2003) 
 Legion of Honour awarded by Republic of France (2004) 
 Rajvotsava Award by Karnataka Government (2004)
 Centenary Prize awarded by Royal Society of Chemistry (2005)
 Trieste Science Prize awarded by World Academy of Sciences (2007) 
 G M Modi Award for Innovative Science and Technology (2007) 
 H. K. Firodia Award for Science & Technology (2010) 
 Distinguished Alumnus Award from BITS Pilani (2011) 
 Order of Merit of the Federal Republic of Germany (2016)
 INSA Medal for Promotion and Service to Science (2017)

Fellowships 
 Fellow of the Indian National Science Academy
 Fellow of the Indian Academy of Sciences
 Fellow of the National Academy of Sciences
 Fellow of the World Academy of Sciences
 Fellow of the Royal Society
 Foreign Member of the Russian Academy of Sciences
 Fellow of the World Innovation Foundation (WIF)
 Fellow of the Royal Society of Chemistry 
 Fellow of Indian Chemical Society
 Fellow of the Andhra Pradesh Akademi of Sciences (now Telangana Academy of Sciences)
 Founding Member of Society for Scientific Values

Important Positions 
 President of Indian National Science Academy (1999-2001) 
 Co-Chair (with Bruce Alberts of US NAS) of the Inter Academy Council (IAC) (2000-2005) 
 President, Chemical Research Society of India (2002-2005) 
 President, Association of Indian Universities (2003) 
 President of ICSU (2005-2008) 
 Chairperson, National Accreditation and Assessment (NAAC) (2006-2012)
 Jury Member for Physical Sciences, Infosys Prize (2012–2015)
 Chairman, Board of Governors, Indian Institute of Technology Jodhpur (2014-2018)
 Chairman, Indian Statistical Institute, Kolkata (2016-2020)
 Chairperson, Council of Management, Jawaharlal Nehru Centre for Advanced Scientific Research (JNCASR) (2018-2022)
 Member, Board of Directors, Dr. Reddy's Institute of Life Sciences
 Chairman & Member, University Grants Commission Panel on Chemistry (1983–93)
 Member, Science & Engineering Research Council (SERC) (1984–90), (1994–97)
 Member, Scientific Advisory Committee, Ministry of Petroleum & Natural Gas (1984–88)
 Member, Government of India Scientific Commission on Bhopal Gas Leakage (1985–87)
 Chairman, National Committee for IUPAC (1991–93)
 Member, India-European Union (EU) Round Table of Eminent Persons

Controversy 
In 2006, the US Government refused Mehta a visa; this decision was strongly criticised by Indian and American scientists. The US Ambassador to India David Mulford offered his apology to Prof. Mehta.

Publications

References

External links 
 

1943 births
Living people
Scientists from Rajasthan
Fellows of the Indian National Science Academy
Fellows of the Royal Society
Foreign Members of the Russian Academy of Sciences
Recipients of the Padma Shri in science & engineering
Savitribai Phule Pune University alumni
Directors of the Indian Institute of Science
People from Jodhpur
Indian chemical engineers
Recipients of the Rajyotsava Award 2004
Recipients of the Order of Merit of the Federal Republic of Germany